Thomas Edgar (by 1508–1547), of Blewbury, Berkshire; Bermondsey, Surrey and London, was an English politician.

He was a Member (MP) of the Parliament of England for Malmesbury in 1529.

References

1547 deaths
English MPs 1529–1536
Year of birth uncertain
People from Blewbury
People from Bermondsey